Brice Owona (born 4 March 1989 in Yaoundé) is a professional Cameroonian footballer currently playing for APEJES.

Career
Owona began his career in January 2002 for AS Fortuna Yaoundé and was in summer 2005 scouted by Cotonsport Garoua. On 12 February 2010 FC St. Gallen has committed the midfielder of Cotonsport Garoua, the offensive player signed a contract until 2012 with FC St. Gallen. On the same day he made his debut for the Ostschweizer club in a friendly game against the Austrian club FC Dornbirn 1913.

International career
He is former member of the Cameroon national under-20 football team and played with the team the 2009 FIFA U-20 World Cup.

References

External links
Brice Owona at Footballdatabase

1988 births
Living people
Cameroonian footballers
Coton Sport FC de Garoua players
Cameroonian expatriate footballers
Cameroonian expatriate sportspeople in Switzerland
FC St. Gallen players
Association football midfielders
Swiss Super League players
Association football forwards
Expatriate footballers in Switzerland
Cameroon under-20 international footballers
Ittihad Tanger players